Joe Parker (born 11 March 1995) is an English Semi - professional footballer who plays as a winger or striker for Chippenham Town.

Career
A product of Hartpury College, Parker joined Conference North club Gloucester City. He attracted the attention of Newport County following a 19-minute hat-trick for Gloucester in an FA Cup third qualifying match against Yate Town. Parker joined Newport in November 2013 and was loaned back to Gloucester City for the remainder of the 2012–13 season. Parker had a further two loan spells with Gloucester City in September and December 2014.

Parker made his Football League debut for Newport County in the League Two fixture versus Cambridge United on 17 January 2015 as a second-half substitute for Andy Sandell. Newport lost the match 4–0. He was released by Newport in May 2015 at the end of his contract.

He currently plays for Chippenham Town, signing for them in the summer of 2022.

Career statistics

References

External links

1995 births
Living people
Footballers from Gloucester
English footballers
Association football forwards
Gloucester City A.F.C. players
Newport County A.F.C. players
Cinderford Town A.F.C. players
National League (English football) players
English Football League players